Skeet shooting is a recreational and competitive activity where participants use shotguns to attempt to break clay targets which two fixed stations mechanically fling into the air at high speed and at a variety of angles.

Skeet is one of the three major disciplines of competitive clay shooting - alongside trap shooting and sporting clays. There are several types of skeet, including one with  Olympic status (often called "Olympic skeet" or "international skeet"), and many with only national recognition.

General principles 

The international version of skeet uses a target that is slightly larger in diameter [(110±1) mm vs. 109.54 mm], thinner in cross-section [(25.5±.5) mm vs. 28.58  mm], and has a thicker dome center, making it harder to break.

The firearm of choice for this task is usually a high-quality, double-barreled over and under shotgun with 26- to 30-inch barrels and very open chokes. Often, shooters will choose an improved cylinder choke (one with a tighter pattern) or a skeet choke (one with a wider pattern), but this is a matter of preference. Some gun shops refer to this type of shotgun as a skeet gun. Skeet chokes are designed to produce a 30 inch shot pattern at 21 yards.

Alternatively, a sporting gun or a trap gun is sometimes used. These have longer barrels (up to 34  inches) and tighter choke. Many shooters of American skeet and other national versions use semi-automatic shotguns and break-open over-and-under shotguns.

The event is in part meant to simulate the action of bird hunting. There are two houses that hold devices known as "traps" that launch the targets, one at each corner of the semicircle.

At stations 1 and 2 the shooter shoots at single targets launched from the high house and then the low house, then shoots a double where the two targets are launched simultaneously but shooting the high house target first. At stations 3, 4, and 5 the shooter shoots at single targets launched from the high house and then the low house. At stations 6 and 7 the shooter shoots at single targets launched from the high house and then the low house, then shoots a double, shooting the low house target first then the high house target. At station 8 the shooter shoots one high target and one low target.

The shooter must then re-shoot his first missed target or, if no targets are missed, must shoot his 25th shell at the low house station 8. This 25th shot was once referred to as the shooter's option, as he was able to take it where he preferred.  Now, to speed up rounds in competition, the shooter must shoot the low 8 twice for a perfect score.

History 
Charles Davis and William Harnden Foster of Andover, Massachusetts invented skeet shooting. In 1920, Davis, an avid grouse hunter, and Foster, an avid hunter, painter, illustrator and author of "New England Grouse Hunting", developed a game which was informally called "Shooting around the clock".  The original course took the form of a circle with a radius of 25 yards with its circumference marked off like the face of a clock and a trap set at the 12-o'clock position. The practice of shooting from all directions had to cease, however, when a chicken farm started next door. The game evolved to its current setup by 1923, when one of the shooters, William Harnden Foster, solved the problem by placing a second trap at the 6-o'clock position and cutting the course in half. Foster quickly noticed the appeal of that kind of competition shooting, and set out to make it a national sport.

The game was introduced in the February 1926 issues of National Sportsman and Hunting and Fishing magazines, and a prize of 100 dollars was offered to anyone who could come up with a name for the new sport. The winning entry was "skeet", chosen by Gertrude Hurlbutt.  The word allegedly derived from the Norwegian word for "shoot" (skyte). The first National Skeet Championship took place in 1926.  Shortly thereafter, the National Skeet Shooting Association formed. During World War II the American military used skeet shooting to teach gunners the principles of leading and timing on a flying target. 

For his role in perfecting and developing the sport, William "Bill" Foster was named as one of the first members to the National Skeet Shooters Association Hall of Fame in 1970, and is now known as "The Father of Skeet".

Olympic skeet

Olympic and international skeet is one of the ISSF shooting events. It has had Olympic status since 1968, and, until 1992, was open to both sexes. After that year, all ISSF events have been open to only one sex, and so women were disallowed to compete in the Olympic skeet competitions. This was controversial because the 1992 Olympic Champion was a woman, Zhang Shan of China. However, women had their own World Championships, and in 2000, a female skeet event was introduced to the Olympic program.

In Olympic skeet, there is a random delay of between 0 and 3 seconds after the shooter has called for the target. Also, the shooter must hold his gun so that the buttstock is at mid-torso level until the target appears.

Another difference with American skeet is that the sequence to complete the 25 targets in a round of Olympic skeet requires shooters to shoot at doubles, not only in stations 1, 2, 6, and 7, as in American skeet, but also on 3, 4, and 5. This includes a reverse double (low house first) on station 4. This last double was introduced in the sequence starting in 2005.

With her bronze in women's skeet shooting at the 2016 Rio Olympic games, Kim Rhode became the first American to medal in 6 successive Olympic games. Her prior Olympic medals were for trap shooting in 1996, 2000 and 2004 and for skeet shooting in 2008 and 2012.

US national variant

American skeet is administered by the National Skeet Shooting Association (NSSA). The targets are shot in a different order and are slower than in Olympic skeet. There is also no delay after the shooter has called for them, and the shooter may do this with the gun held "up", i.e. pre-mounted on the shoulder (as is allowed in trap shooting).

A full tournament is typically conducted over the course of five events. These include four events each shot with a different maximum permissible gauge. These maximum gauges are 12, 20, 28, and .410 bore. The fifth event, usually shot first in a five event competition, is Doubles, during which a pair of targets is thrown simultaneously at stations 1 through 7, and then from station 6 back through either station 2 or 1, depending on the round. The maximum gauge permitted in Doubles is 12 gauge. Each of the five events usually consists of 100 targets (four standard boxes of ammunition). All ties in potential winning scores are broken by shoot offs, usually sudden death by station, and usually shot as doubles, from stations 3, 4 and 5. Tournament management has the right to change the shoot format with respect to the order in which events are conducted, the number of events in a given shoot, and the rules governing shoot offs.

Each event normally constitutes a separate championship. In addition, the scores in the four singles events are combined to crown a High Over All ("HOA") champion for the tournament, a coveted title. On occasion, the scores for all five events are also combined, to determine the High All Around ("HAA") champion.

The requisite use of the small bore shotguns, including the difficult .410, is a major differentiation between the American version of the sport and the International version. Some would argue that it makes the American version at least as difficult as the International version, though perhaps at greater expense, given the necessity of one or more guns capable of shooting in all events.

For practical purposes, there are three types of shotguns if the shooter must have two shots in rapid succession, a requirement for American skeet.  The types are: the pump-action, the semi-automatic, and a double-barreled shotgun.  A Pump-action shotgun operates with one hand on the grip and trigger, and the other on a sliding wooden or composite forearm.  In turn, the forearm is attached to one or two bars that operate the action, both to load the chamber with the first round and to cycle the action after firing, putting another round in the chamber for the second shot.   The power is supplied by the shooter pulling the forearm back and then pushing it forward: a process prone to error on the skeet field because it requires speed, consistency, and precision from the shooter.   
 
A semi-automatic shotgun has a fixed forearm: it relies on either the burning, expanding, gas from the first fired round, or the recoil from the same fired round, to cycle the action.  Such a gun cycles "automatically" each time it is fired: ejecting the just fired, now empty, shell casing, and ramming a new round into the chamber for a second shot.  One sees semi-automatics in tournaments, occasionally, now.  They shoot well when clean, but are prone to jamming when dirty, when fouled by debris, or when there is something unusual about the rounds in gun. Just how prone to jamming varies by brand, design and shooter maintenance.  They largely supplanted pump guns in skeet tournaments during the 1960s, because, even if they jam from time to time, semi-automatics still invite less error than all the activity the shooter must control with a pump gun.  Further, semi-automatics usually offer a softer recoil, a real benefit given all the rounds fired in a skeet tournament.  Semi-automatics are most reliable with 12 ga. rounds, and are thus most used in the 12 ga. skeet events.  
 
A double-barreled shotgun is just that: two single shot barrels and hammer sets attached to the same receiver and trigger assembly.  The barrels are attached to each other and are aimed to hit the same spot a given distance: say, 21 yards or so at skeet (though the shot pattern from both barrels will still be very close both before and after that yardage, because the barrels are very close together).  The barrel set hinges on the bottom of the gun's receiver and is locked in place by lever on top of the action.  When the lever is pushed, it releases the barrels, allowing them to swing down from the hinge, exposing the chambers for each barrel.  The shooter drops one round into each chamber and then swings the barrels back up, closing and locking the breech.  The act of opening and closing the gun cocks both hammers, each of which are activated, in a modern gun, by a single trigger: once the action is closed, the gun will fire two shots as fast as a person can pull the trigger twice.  A two barrel gun can have the two barrels side by side or one on top of the other (stacked).  All serious skeet tournament two barrel guns are stacked (the narrow sighting picture is an advantage), and are most commonly referred to as "over and under" shotguns.  Two barrel guns are the least fussy about ammunition and surest method of getting two fast shots from a shotgun.  These guns also permit the shooter to recover every just-fired shotgun shell, to be reloaded and used again, a convenient and valuable characteristic.

Regardless of the type of gun employed, tournament skeet shooters have a problem.  American skeet tournaments consist of at least four events: the 12 ga., the 20 ga., the 28 ga., and the .410 bore.  These are four different sized shotgun shells (diminishing in size, in the order listed), requiring four different sets of chambers.   Historically, that required four different guns, each weighing, balancing and presenting, differently, undermining a shooter's consistency.  There is relatively little manufacturer interest in a cure for the problem with pumps and automatics.  However, double guns present opportunities.  One solution is to build four matched weight sets of barrels to fit one action (a "four barrel set").  This is expensive, from the 1970s to 1990s, four barrel sets reigned supreme in American skeet, and they remain thoroughly competitive.  Beyond the expense, the principal criticism is that the four barrel set can still present a different sight picture for each gauge, because each barrel set, in diminishing gauge, is narrower than the prior set. 
 
The answer was to build barrel inserts for 12 ga. two barrel guns:  these allow the shooter to switch out matching sets of full length light weight aluminum tubes (10-12 oz. per set) chambered for 20, 28, and .410, in almost any 12 ga. double gun.  One could then use one gun to shoot the 20, 28, and .410 events with the same weight, balance and sight picture for each of these gauges.  However, with tubes removed to shoot 12 ga. rounds, the gun will be 10-12 oz. lighter, and thus will swing faster and kick harder, undermining some of the consistency intrinsic to the concept.  The solutions are: to stop shooting 12 ga. rounds at all in tournaments, thus always shooting through the inserts; buying a second, pre-weighted 12 ga. barrel (the latter makes the combination a "two barrel tube set"); or, three, adding removable weights to the 12 ga. barrels when shooting without the sub-gauge tubes, to try to match the weight and balance of the gun when tubed.  All three solutions are employed, depending upon shooter preferences and/or resources, and tubed over and under shoguns now dominate American skeet tournaments.

So effective is the tubed gun solution that perfect scores are often required to win the open title in individual events, and combined scores of 395 to 400 may be required to win the open HOA in a major shoot, depending on the weather (though a perfect score of 400 remains a rare and noteworthy event). For example, the HOA title at the 2007 US Open tournament, shot in Albuquerque, New Mexico between September 6 and 9, was won in a shoot off between two competitors, each of whom shot a combined score of 399 out of a possible 400.

Recognizing that a high level of perfection is beyond the skill, interest, or time available to most shooters, NSSA competitions are subdivided into several classes, each based on the running average score shot over the last five most recent events shot in each gauge, prior to any given competition. This permits shooters of roughly equal ability at the relevant point in time to compete against each other for the individual and HOA titles in their class.

Other national versions of skeet (e.g., English skeet) typically make similar changes to the rules to make them easier.

See also
 ISSF Olympic skeet
 ISSF shooting events
 Trap shooting
 Double trap
 International Shooting Sport Federation
U.S. intercollegiate trap and skeet shooting champions

References

National associations
National Skeet Shooting Association (US) 
Clay Pigeon Shooting Association (UK)
New Zealand Clay Target Association
Australian Clay Target Association

US state associations
North Carolina Skeet Shooting Association (US) 
Mississippi Skeet Shooting Association (US) 
New Jersey Skeet Shooting Association (US)

US zone associations
Zone VI Skeet Shooting Association (AR, LA, MS, OK, TX) (US)

External links

 
 Skeet, trap, and sporting clay club locator (U.S.)

ISSF shooting events
Shotgun shooting sports
Rifle and pistol shooting sports
Clay pigeon shooting

fr:Ball-trap